NA-20 Swabi-II is a constituency for the National Assembly of Pakistan. The constituency was formerly known as NA-13 (Swabi-II) from 1977 to 2018. The name changed to NA-19 (Swabi-II) after the delimitation in 2018 and to NA-20 (Swabi-II) after the delimitation in 2022.

Members of Parliament

1977–2002: NA-13 Swabi-II

2002–2018: NA-13 Swabi-II

2018-2022: NA-19 Swabi-II

Elections since 2002

2002 general election

A total of 2,515 votes were rejected.

2008 general election

A total of 2,685 votes were rejected.

2013 general election

A total of 4,191 votes were rejected.

2013 By-election

The member elected in the 2013 General Election, Asad Qasiar, decided to vacate this seat. This resulted in a by-election being triggered, which took place on 22 August 2013.

A total of 917 votes were rejected.

2018 general election 

General elections were held on 25 July 2018.

†JUI-F contested as part of MMA

By-election 2023 
A by-election will be held on 19 March 2023 due to the resignation of Usman Khan Tarakai, the previous MNA from this seat.

See also
NA-19 Swabi-I
NA-21 Mardan-I

References

External links 
 Election result's official website

19
19